The Low Islets, part of the Passage Group within the Furneaux Group, is a close pair of unpopulated small granite islands with a combined area of  , located in Bass Strait, south of Cape Barren Island, and west of both Spike and Clarke islands, in Tasmania, in south-eastern Australia.

Fauna
The island is one of only three sites where pelicans breed in Tasmania. Recorded breeding seabird, wader and waterbird species include little penguin, Pacific gull, silver gull, sooty oystercatcher, black-faced cormorant, Australian pelican, Caspian tern, crested tern and white-fronted tern.

See also

 List of islands of Tasmania

References

Furneaux Group
Islands of North East Tasmania
Islands of Bass Strait